ToadWorks is a guitar effect brand owned by Ryan Dunn and Doug Harrison based in Spokane, Washington. ToadWorks is primarily known for manufacturing the Mr. Ed distortion pedal, the Barracuda flanger, and the Texas Flood overdrive.

History
ToadWorks was formed in 2001 in Mountain View, CA. During the first year of ToadWorks' existence, operations were located in Ryan Dunn's garage. By 2002 the company had moved to San Diego, where it continued to manufacture products. In 2003 the company was moved back up to San Francisco, where it occupied the top floor of the famous Hobart Building on Market St. In 2005, the company moved operations to Spokane, WA, where it continues to manufacture its increasingly diverse product line.

In January 2008, ToadWorks announced plans to release a flanger effect pedal called Barracuda. This new effect is intended to emulate the distinctive flanger effect heard on the Heart song of the same name. Using a custom-made flanger effect given to them by Howard Leese, ToadWorks initially attempted to reverse-engineer the circuit, but concluded the original circuit contained design elements that could not be duplicated using modern components, so a new circuit was designed. ToadWorks refers to this new circuit as the "Howard Leese Signature Model", although the true history regarding the effect from the actual recording is disputed. A new release date for this product has been set for January 2009.

On April 13, 2013, ToadWorks USA released a press release announcing the re-branding of the product line to 'TEN Effects'.

Toadworks in Australia
Toadworks are currently solely distributed in New South Wales, Australia by Powerhouse Music and Technology and in Queensland by TYM Guitars as well as in Melbourne by RockLogic Melbourne.

References

External links
Toadworks Global Website

Music equipment manufacturers
Guitar effects manufacturing companies